Drumsamney is a townland lying within the civil parish of Kilcronaghan, County Londonderry, Northern Ireland. It lies in the south-east of the parish on the boundary of the civil parish of Desertmartin, and is bounded by the townlands of; Annagh & Moneysterlin, Ballinderry, Killynumber, Dromore, and Gortamney. In the Plantation of Ulster it was given as a glebe to the Drapers Company.

The townland was part of Tobermore electoral ward of the former Magherafelt District Council, however in 1926 it was part of Tobermore district electoral division as part of the Maghera division of Magherafelt Rural District. It was also part of the historic barony of Loughinsholin.

Etymology
Drumsamney derives its name from the Irish Droim Samhna, meaning "ridge of Samhain". This ridge likely refers to Drumsamney Hill, with the second element of the name relating to the pagan festival of Samhain. The townlands of Drumsawna Beg and Drumsawna More in County Fermanagh also derive from the same origin as Drumsamney.

History

See also
Kilcronaghan
List of townlands in Tobermore
Tobermore

References

Townlands of County Londonderry
Civil parish of Kilcronaghan

ga:Droim Sorn